Reel 2 Remixed, the second album released by the house/reggae-influenced musical project Reel 2 Real, is a remix of their first album, Move It!.

Track listing

All tracks are produced by Erick Morillo with co-producers Keith Litman, Ralphie Muniz, and Peter Tulloch, featuring vocals by Althea McQueen and Mark Quashie.

References 

Reel 2 Real albums
1995 remix albums